Seyl Cheshmeh may refer to:

Seyl Cheshmeh-ye Olya
Seyl Cheshmeh-ye Sofla